The 2019 West Devon Borough Council election took place on 2 May 2019, to elect members of West Devon Borough Council in England. This was on the same day as other local elections across England.

Result

Election result

|-

Results by Ward

Bere Ferrers

Robin Musgrave was the winning Independent candidate in 2015.

Bridestowe

Buckland Monachorum

Burrator

Chagford

Dartmoor

Drewsteignton

Exbourne

Hatherleigh

Mary Tavy

Milton Ford

Neil Jory was an incumbent councillor for Tavistock North ward.

Okehampton North

Okehampton South

South Tawton

Louise Watts was an incumbent councillor for the Exbourne ward.

Tamarside

Chris Edmonds was the winning Independent candidate in 2015. The change in his share of the vote is shown from his result in 2015, rather than the Conservative candidate's.

Tavistock North

Tavistock South East

Tavistock South West

By-elections

Bere Ferrers

Tavistock North

References 

West Devon
West Devon Borough Council elections
May 2019 events in the United Kingdom
2010s in Devon